On August 28, 1884, a tornado outbreak, including a family of least five strong tornadoes, affected portions of the Dakota Territory within present-day South Dakota. Among them was one of the first known tornadoes to have been photographed, an estimated F4 on the Fujita scale, that occurred near Howard and exhibited multiple vortices. Another violent tornado also occurred near Alexandria, and three other tornadoes were also reported. A sixth tornado also occurred in present-day Davison County. In all, the tornadoes killed at least seven people and injured at least two others. Contemporary records and survivors' recollections indicate that the storms were F3 or F4 on the Fujita scale, but cannot currently be verified, as official records begin in 1950.

Confirmed tornadoes

August 28 event

See also
List of North American tornadoes and tornado outbreaks

Notes

References

Sources

Tornado outbreaks with no Fujita scale ratings given
Tornadoes of 1884
Tornadoes in South Dakota
Howard, South Dakota Tornado, 1884
McCook County, South Dakota
1884 natural disasters in the United States
August 1884 events